Wilmot is a city in Roberts County, South Dakota, United States. The population was 432 at the 2020 census.

History
Wilmot, as well as Brookings, were named for Wilmot Brookings, who was provisional governor of the Dakota Territory.

Description
The Wilmot School's mascot is The Wolves. Also known as Gixxlies   The local paper is the Wilmot Enterprise.

Wilmot's town and post office were organized in 1881 after a several years period of intense Norwegian homesteading in the area.

Geography
Wilmot is located in Roberts County, South Dakota.

Wilmot has been assigned the ZIP code 57279 and the FIPS place code 71980.

Demographics

2010 census
As of the census of 2010, there were 492 people, 208 households, and 122 families living in the city. The racial makeup of the city was 89.4% White, 7.9% Native American, 0.4% from other races, and 2.2% from two or more races. Hispanic or Latino of any race were 1.4% of the population.

There were 208 households, of which 28.4% had children under the age of 18 living with them, 45.2% were married couples living together, 8.7% had a female householder with no husband present, 4.8% had a male householder with no wife present, and 41.3% were non-families. 37.5% of all households were made up of individuals, and 18.2% had someone living alone who was 65 years of age or older. The average household size was 2.22 and the average family size was 2.93.

The median age in the city was 45.4 years. 24.8% of residents were under the age of 18; 4.8% were between the ages of 18 and 24; 19.8% were from 25 to 44; 25.4% were from 45 to 64; and 25.2% were 65 years of age or older. The gender makeup of the city was 50.2% male and 49.8% female.

2000 census
As of the census of 2000, there were 543 people, 231 households, and 133 families living in the city. The population density was 1,101.2 people per square mile (427.9/km2). There were 252 housing units at an average density of 511.0 per square mile (198.6/km2). The racial makeup of the city was 90.98% White, 7.00% Native American, 0.37% Asian, and 1.66% from two or more races. Hispanic or Latino of any race were 0.18% of the population.

There were 231 households, out of which 27.7% had children under the age of 18 living with them, 46.3% were married couples living together, 7.8% had a female householder with no husband present, and 42.4% were non-families. 40.7% of all households were made up of individuals, and 23.4% had someone living alone who was 65 years of age or older. The average household size was 2.24 and the average family size was 3.02.

In the city, the population was spread out, with 25.6% under the age of 18, 5.2% from 18 to 24, 20.4% from 25 to 44, 19.0% from 45 to 64, and 29.8% who were 65 years of age or older. The median age was 44 years. For every 100 females, there were 94.6 males. For every 100 females age 18 and over, there were 84.5 males.

The median income for a household in the city was $25,000, and the median income for a family was $29,750. Males had a median income of $22,125 versus $15,673 for females. The per capita income for the city was $13,561. About 13.6% of families and 16.7% of the population were below the poverty line, including 15.2% of those under age 18 and 22.9% of those age 65 or over.

Transportation
Wilmot is served by two state highways:
  South Dakota Highway 15, which runs along the northern border of town
   South Dakota Highway 123, which runs through the western part of town to end at SD 15

Notable people
Royce Williams, ace Navy pilot during the Korean War

See also
 List of cities in South Dakota

References

External links

 

Cities in Roberts County, South Dakota
Cities in South Dakota